Sebastian Lotzer (c. 1490 – after 1525) was born in Horb am Neckar. He was a furrier by trade. During his journeyman years, while in Memmingen, he became secretary to the Baltringer Haufen, a peasant army during the German Peasants' War. Lotzer was heavily influenced by theologian Christoph Schappeler.

In 1525, representing the 27 villages of the territory of Memmingen he drew up the Memmingen Articles, and shortly afterwards, in conjunction with the Christian Confederation, the Twelve Articles.

Following the defeat of the peasants by the Swabian League Lotzer had to flee from Memmingen in April 1525. He was last heard of in St. Gallen. His date of death is unknown.

External links

Year of death unknown
1490 births
Fur
German scribes
German male writers